Joseph Wostoupal, Jr. (January 1, 1903 – July 31, 1966) was a professional American football player who played offensive lineman for four seasons for the Kansas City Cowboys, Detroit Panthers, and New York Giants.

References

Joe Wostoupal's profile at NFL.com

1903 births
1966 deaths
American football centers
Nebraska Cornhuskers football players
Kansas City Cowboys (NFL) players
Detroit Panthers players
New York Giants players
Players of American football from Nebraska
People from West Point, Nebraska